Jack Stackpoole (23 November 1916 – 24 October 2010) was an Australian cricketer. He played in three first-class matches for Queensland between 1939 and 1941. He was one of only two bowlers to dismiss Don Bradman with their first delivery.

See also
 List of Queensland first-class cricketers

References

External links
 

1916 births
2010 deaths
Australian cricketers
Queensland cricketers
Cricketers from Queensland